Dragon Club de Yaoundé is a Cameroonian football club. They are a member of the Cameroonian Football Federation and currently play in the top domestic league Elite One.

External links
Dragon Club de Yaoundé at Soccerway

Football clubs in Yaoundé